The Ampthill Clay is a Mesozoic geologic formation in southern England. Dinosaur remains diagnostic to the genus level are among the fossils that have been recovered from the formation.

Vertebrate paleofauna
 Cryptosaurus eumerus "Femur."

See also

 List of dinosaur-bearing rock formations
 List of stratigraphic units with few dinosaur genera

Footnotes

References
 Weishampel, David B.; Dodson, Peter; and Osmólska, Halszka (eds.): The Dinosauria, 2nd, Berkeley: University of California Press. 861 pp. .

Oxfordian Stage